The 1986–87 season was Manchester City's 85th season of competitive football and 65th season in the top division of English football. In addition to the First Division, the club competed in the FA Cup, Football League Cup and Full Members' Cup. The club was relegated to the second division at the end of the season.

First Division

League table

Results summary

Results by matchday

FA Cup

EFL Cup

Full Members' Cup

References

External links

Manchester City F.C. seasons
Manchester City
Articles which contain graphical timelines